Lugenge is a town and ward in Njombe Urban District in the Njombe Region of the Tanzanian Southern Highlands.

Notes

Wards of Njombe Region